Iphiana is a genus of sea snails, marine gastropod mollusks in the subfamily Turbonillinae of the family Pyramidellidae, the pyrams and their allies.

Species
 Iphiana danieli Peñas & Rolán, 2016
 Iphiana densestriata (Garrett, 1873)
 Iphiana microperforata Peñas & Rolán, 2016
 Iphiana mira (Yokoyama, 1922)
 Iphiana tenuisculpta (Lischke, 1872)

References

External links
 To World Register of Marine Species

Pyramidellidae